Kishori Chand Mitra (18221873) was a writer, civil servant and social worker.

Early life and education 

Mitra was born in Kolkata although  his ancestral village is Panisheola in Hooghly District of present-day West Bengal. His brother was writer Peary Chand Mitra. He studied in Hindu College (later renamed to Presidency University).

Career 

Since 1846 Mitra served as the deputy magistrate of Rampur-Boalia (present Rajshahi) for about eight years. He served as the police magistrate of Kolkata during 1854-1858.

Mitra founded a weekly newspaper Indian Field in 1859. Later, in 1865, it was merged with the Hindoo Patriot. He contributed to the Calcutta Review, Hindoo Patriot, Bengal Spectator and Bengal Magazine. He was involved in the foundation and functioning of the Hare Memorial Society, Bethune Society, Social Science Association and Hindu Theosophical Society.

References 

1822 births
1873 deaths
19th-century Bengalis
Bengali Hindus
Writers from Kolkata
Bengali writers
Brahmos
Bengali-language writers
Presidency University, Kolkata alumni
Indian editors
Indian newspaper editors
Indian journalists
19th-century Indian journalists
Journalists from West Bengal
Indian social workers
Indian social reformers
Indian civil servants
Indian writers
Indian male writers
19th-century Indian writers
19th-century Indian male writers